Wanderlust is a strong desire for or impulse to wander or travel and explore the world.

Wanderlust may also refer to:

Film and television
Wanderlust (2006 film), a documentary
Wanderlust (2012 film), an American comedy starring Jennifer Aniston and Paul Rudd
Wanderlust (Irish TV series), an Irish television show hosted by Brendan Courtney
Wanderlust (UK TV series), a BBC One/Netflix TV series starring Toni Collette
Gerhard Reinke's Wanderlust, a television show

Music
Wanderlust (band), an American power pop band in the mid-1990s
Wanderlust (jazz band), an Australian contemporary jazz band

Songs
"Wanderlust", by Johnny Hodges and Duke Ellington from the 1963 album Duke Ellington Meets Coleman Hawkins
"Wanderlust", by Paul McCartney from the 1982 album Tug of War
"Wanderlust", by Claire Voyant from the 1995 album Claire Voyant
"Wanderlust", by David Sylvian from the 1999 album Dead Bees on a Cake
"Wanderlust", by Megadeth from the 1999 album Risk
"Wanderlust", by Nightwish from the 2000 album Wishmaster
"Wanderlust", by Mark Knopfler from the 2000 album Sailing to Philadelphia
"Wanderlust", by Delays from the 2004 album Faded Seaside Glamour
"Wanderlust", by Flogging Molly from the 2004 album Within a Mile of Home
"Wanderlust" (R.E.M. song), by R.E.M. from the 2004 album Around the Sun
"Wanderlust", by Fozzy from the 2005 album All That Remains
"Wanderlust", by Frank Black from the 2006 album Fast Man Raider Man
"Wanderlust", by Baroness from the 2007 album Red Album
"Wanderlust" (Björk song), by Björk from the 2007 album Volta
"Wanderlust", by Every Time I Die from the 2009 album New Junk Aesthetic
"Wanderlust", by The Upwelling from the 2009 album An American Stranger
"Wanderlust", by Frank Turner, a bonus track from the 2011 album England Keep My Bones
"The Wanderlust", by Metric from the 2012 album Synthetica, featuring Lou Reed
"Wanderlust" (The Weeknd song), by The Weeknd from the 2013 album Kiss Land
"Wanderlust II", by the Scottish band Love and Money
"Wanderlust", by Polly Scattergood released both as a single and on the 2013 album Arrows
"Wanderlust" by Wild Beasts from the 2014 album Present Tense
"Wanderlust" by James Bay from the 2018 album Electric Light

Albums
Wanderlust (Frankie Laine album), a 1963 album by Frankie Laine
Wanderlust (Bill Leverty album), a 2004 album by FireHouse guitarist Bill Leverty
WANDERlust (Gavin Rossdale album), a 2008 album by Gavin Rossdale
Wanderlust (Finnr's Cane album), a 2010 album by Finnr's Cane
Wanderlust (Mike Bukovsky album), a 1993 album by Miroslav Bukovsky
Wanderlust (Sophie Ellis-Bextor album), a 2014 album by Sophie Ellis-Bextor
Wanderlust (Little Big Town album), a 2016 album by Little Big Town
Wanderlust (Blancmange album), a 2018 album by Blancmange

Literature
Wanderlust (Steel novel), a 1986 romantic novel by Danielle Steel
Wanderlust (Dragonlance novel), a fantasy novel set in the Dragonlance universe
Wanderlust: A History of Walking, a 2002 book by Rebecca Solnit

Video games
Wanderlust Interactive, a video game developer and publisher that made The Pink Panther: Passport to Peril
Wanderlust: Rebirth, a video game published by Chucklefish
Wanderlust Adventures, a sequel to Wanderlust: Rebirth, also published by Chucklefish
 Wanderlust Travel Stories, a 2019 adventure game

Other
Wanderlust (magazine), a UK-based travel magazine and website offering travel advice and inspiration
USS Wanderlust (SP-923), a United States Navy patrol vessel in commission from 1917 to 1919
Wanderlust, a cream ale made by Pete's Brewing Company
Wanderlust Festival, a summer festival featuring yoga and leading rock musicians
Wanderlust, a mail client for Emacs

See also
Wonderlust, a 2000 album by Heather Nova